Ellendale is a rural locality in the local government area (LGA) of Central Highlands in the Central LGA region of Tasmania. The 2016 census recorded a population of 241 for the state suburb of Ellendale.
It is a village in Tasmania 75 kilometres from Hobart in the Derwent Valley.

History 
Ellendale was gazetted as a locality in 1959. The locality was named for the wife of Nicholas John Brown, who was the Minister for Lands and Works when it was surveyed.

Ellendale Post Office opened on 16 April 1880.

Geography
The River Derwent (Meadowbank Lake) forms part of the north-eastern boundary, while the Broad River forms the north-western. The Jones River flows through from south to north.

Road infrastructure
Route C608 (Ellendale Road) runs through from north to south-east.

References

Towns in Tasmania
Localities of Central Highlands Council